Kowloon Central may refer to:

 the central part of Kowloon, Hong Kong
 Kowloon Central (2021 constituency)
 Kowloon Central (1995 constituency)
 Kowloon Central (1991 constituency)

See also

 Central Kowloon Health Centre, aka Central Kowloon Clinic
 Central Kowloon Route
 Kowloon Central Cluster of the Hospital Authority
 Kowloon Central Post Office